The 75th edition of the KNVB Cup started on August 29, 1992. The final was played on May 20, 1993: Ajax beat sc Heerenveen 6–2 and won the cup for the twelfth time.

Teams
 All 18 participants of the Eredivisie 1992-93, eleven of which entering in the third round, the rest entering in the second round
 All 18 participants of the Eerste Divisie 1992-93, entering in the second round
 27 teams from lower (amateur) leagues, seven of which entering in the second round

First round
The matches of the first round were played on August 29 and 30, 1992. Only amateur clubs participated.

Second round
The matches of the second round were played on September 18, 19 and 20, 1992. Except for eleven teams from the Eredivisie, all the other participating clubs entered the tournament here.

E Eredivisie; 1 Eerste Divisie; A Amateur teams

Third round
The matches of the third round were played on October 28, 1992. The eleven highest ranked Eredivisie teams from last season entered the tournament here.

E eleven Eredivisie entrants

Round of 16
The matches of the round of 16 were played on December 2, 1992.

Quarter finals
The quarter finals were played on February 17, 1993.

Semi-finals
The semi-finals were played on March 30 and 31, 1993.

Final

Ajax would participate in the Cup Winners' Cup.

See also
Eredivisie 1992-93
Eerste Divisie 1992-93

External links
 Netherlands Cup Full Results 1970–1994 by the RSSSF
 Results by Ronald Zwiers 

1992-93
1992–93 domestic association football cups
1992–93 in Dutch football